Greenview is a census-designated place in Boone County, West Virginia, United States. Its population was 378 as of the 2010 census.

Notable person
Kenneth Keller Hall, United States federal district and appellate judge

References

Census-designated places in Boone County, West Virginia
Census-designated places in West Virginia